Ali Asghar "Navid" Ashouri is an Iranian football midfielder who plays for Gol Gohar Sirjan in the Persian Gulf Pro League.

Club career
Ashouri started his career with his home side Shahrdari Hamedan. Later he joined to Pas Hamedan and Alvand Hamedan. In summer 2014, he joined to Foolad Novin and helped them in promoting to Persian Gulf Pro League with scoring 7 times in 21 match. In summer 2015 he joined to Esteghlal Khuzestan with a 2 years contract. He made his debut for Esteghlal Khuzestan on July 30, 2015 against Sepahan as a substitute for Hadi Khanifar.

Club career statistics

Honours

Club
Foolad Novin
 Azadegan League (1): 2014–15

Esteghlal Khuzestan
Iran Pro League (1): 2015–16
Iranian Super Cup runner-up: 2016

Individual
 Football's 2nd Division Top Goalscorer: 2011–12
 Football's 3rd Division Top Goalscorer: 2009–10

References

External links
 Ali Asghar Ashouri at IranLeague.ir

1988 births
Living people
Iranian footballers
Esteghlal Khuzestan players
People from Hamadan
Association football forwards
Nassaji Mazandaran players